Wajed Ali Khan Panni (also known as Chand Mian; 14 November 1871 – 25 April 1936) was a Bengali politician, educationist and the zamindar of Karatia.

Early life

Panni was born into a Bengali Muslim family in Karatia, Tangail, Bengal Presidency in 1871. His father, Hafez Mahmud Ali Khan Panni, belonged to the Karatia Zamindari, a wealthy landowning family in the area. Their forefathers were Pashtuns of the Panni tribe, and had migrated from Afghanistan during the Mughal period. Panni was homeschooled by private tutors and learned Arabic, Bengali, English, Persian, and Urdu.

Career
In 1892, Panni assisted the poet Naimuddin in translating the Fatawa-e-Alamgiri into four volumes in Bengali, with his father's patronage.

At the start of the 20th century, Panni ordered the digging of a canal, known as Katakhali, in order to aid communication in Tangail. Panni aided Abu Ahmad Ghuznavi Khan, the Zamindar of Delduar, in repairing the Atia Mosque in 1909 which was founded by his ancestor, Sayeed Khan Panni.

Panni helped the Nawab of Dhaka Khwaja Salimullah organize the Muslim Education Conference in Karatia in 1913. He founded two schools in Karatia after the conference, Hafez Mahmud Ali Khan High School, named after his father, and Rokeya Aliyah Madrasah, named after his wife. He served as the head of the Mymensingh District Khilafat movement committee and the unit of All India Congress, serving as vice-president of the Bengal Provincial Congress Committee. He was jailed for his role in the Khilafat movement in December 1921.

Panni founded Saadat College in July 1926, named after his grandfather Saadat Ali Khan Panni, which was one of the country's first five university-colleges and the first college in rural Bengal. He was a philanthropist who spent 20 percent of his own income in charity work. As a landlord, he was known to have been fair to his ryots/tenants and waive rent in case of natural disasters such as famine or flood. Panni also established a Sharia department in his land which was engaged by 700 Islamic scholars.

Panni also established the Karatia Zamindar Bari (Karatia Palace) and one of the buildings, Rokeya Manzil, was named after his wife.

Panni died in 1936.

References

1871 births
1936 deaths
Bengali politicians
People from Tangail District
Karatia Zamindari family
19th-century Bengalis
20th-century Bengalis